Garret Wesley (circa 1665 – 28 September 1728) was an Irish Member of Parliament.

He represented Trim from 1692 to 1693, Athboy from 1695 to 1699, County Meath from 1711 to 1714 and then Trim again from 1727 to his death.

He was the son of Garret Wesley I and Elizabeth Colley. He married Katherine Keating but had no issue. His maternal great-grandfather was Dudley Colley: on his death he left his property to his cousin Richard Wesley, 1st Baron Mornington, on condition that he take the surname Wesley. Richard was the grandfather of Arthur Wellesley, 1st Duke of Wellington.

References
 https://web.archive.org/web/20090601105535/http://www.leighrayment.com/commons/irelandcommons.htm

Year of birth uncertain
1660s births
1728 deaths
Members of the Parliament of Ireland (pre-1801) for County Meath constituencies
Irish MPs 1692–1693
Irish MPs 1695–1699
Irish MPs 1703–1713
Irish MPs 1727–1760